Reggie Showers (born February 6, 1964) was a two-time motorcycle drag racing world champion in the IDBA as a double amputee,  and a motivational speaker.

Accident
In 1978, at the age of 14, Showers lost both of his legs below the knee in an electrical accident.  He later said of his disability, "It really didn't faze me; it was kind of surreal.  I just said, 'Come on, let's get it over with.' This was another challenge."

Motorcycle drag racing
Showers had a successful career drag racing motorcycles in the National Hot Rod Association series.  He used specially-made race-day prosthetics that made him shorter than his usual stature. Showers has retired from drag racing.  He is now a motivational speaker working with mentorship programs; he is also an enthusiastic participant in adaptive snowboarding.

On Saturday, 21 June 2008, Showers proposed to his girlfriend Vikki on-camera during the ESPN2 coverage of the NHRA Super Nationals in Englishtown, NJ. It aired on Sunday, 29 June 2008 during the NHRA Summit Nationals in Norwalk, OH.

Notes

External links 
 Reggie showers profile
 NHRA article on Reggie Showers

1964 births
Living people
African-American racing drivers
American amputees
American disabled sportspeople
Motorcycle drag racers
21st-century African-American people
20th-century African-American sportspeople